Filighera is a comune (municipality) in the Province of Pavia in the Italian region Lombardy, located about 35 km southeast of Milan and about 13 km east of Pavia.

Filighera borders the following municipalities: Albuzzano, Belgioioso, Copiano, Corteolona e Genzone, Vistarino.

References

Cities and towns in Lombardy